Edakkalathur  is a village in Thrissur district in the state of Kerala, India.

Demographics
 India census, Edakkalathur had a population of 7510 with 3640 males and 3870 females.

References

Villages in Thrissur district